A volcanogenic lake is a lake formed as a result of volcanic activity. They are generally a body of water inside an inactive volcanic crater (crater lakes) but can also be large volumes of molten lava within an active volcanic crater (lava lakes) and waterbodies constrained by lava flows, pyroclastic flows or lahars in valley systems. The term volcanic lake is also used to describe volcanogenic lakes, although it is more commonly assigned to those inside volcanic craters.

Volcanic crater lakes

Lakes in calderas fill large craters formed by the collapse of a volcano during an eruption. Examples:
Crater Lake, Oregon, United States
Heaven Lake, China/North Korea
Lake Toba, Sumatra, Indonesia

Lakes in maars fill small craters where an eruption deposited debris around a vent. Examples:
Lake Nyos, Northwest Region, Cameroon
Lac Pavin, Puy-de-Dôme, France
Soda Lakes, Nevada, United States

Lava lakes

These are some examples of rare lava lakes where molten lava in a volcano maintains relative equilibrium, neither rising to overflowing nor sinking to drain away.
Mount Erebus, Ross Island, Antarctica
Erta Ale, Afar Region, Ethiopia
Mount Nyiragongo, North Kivu, Democratic Republic of the Congo

Lava-dammed lakes

Lake Balık, Ağrı Province, Turkey
Lake Disappear, North Island, New Zealand
Garibaldi Lake, British Columbia, Canada
Lake Güija, Guatemala/El Salvador

References

Further reading 
 
   (entire volume about crater lakes)
 
   (entire issue about chemistry of crater lakes)

External links 

 IAVCEI Commission of Volcanic Lakes
 IAVCEI Commission of Volcanic Lakes: Some fundamentals about Crater Lakes
 The Science of Volcanic Lakes
 Volcanic Lakes of the World
 USGS Hawaiian Volcano Observatory: Water on volcanoes: heavy rain and crater lakes
 USGS Cascades Volcano Observatory: Volcanic Lakes
 The Science of Volcanic Lakes, Greg Pasternack, U. California Davis
 Crater Lake National Park documentation in Building Oregon: Architecture of Oregon & the Pacific Northwest archive
 World Volcanic Lakes Map

 
Lakes by type
Volcanic landforms